Karakaattam ( or "karakam ( 'water pot') dance") is an ancient folk dance of Tamil Nadu performed in praise of the rain goddess Mariamman. The ancient Tamil epic says that this type of dance derived from Bharatham and a  mixture of multiple forms of Tamil dance forms like Bharatanatyam postures and mudras. The offering of this dance is to the goddess to bless rain. The dance accompanies songs like folk Carnatic (Amrithavarshini).

The performers balance a pot on their head. Traditionally, this dance is categorized into two types:

Aatta Karakam symbolizes joy and happiness. It is mainly performed as entertainment.

Sakthi Karakam is performed only in temples as a spiritual offering.

Karakkatam invokes rain through a classical Tamil dance. The most common song employs Amrithavarshini Ragam (Ragamalika). Tamils believed that mother nature gives bountiful rain and protects the harvest.

Attire

Karakattam is traditionally performed in a saree. However, attire can vary as the main property is to have a karakam (Pot) on the head of the dancer. Common attire includes sarees or kurtha, colored towels and a pot.

The current karakattam fashion appears to have been corrupted, probably due to lack of support with Bharatanatyam purists dismissing the art as non-traditional and low class, as it has been reduced to more of a night glamour art, with young girls in skimpy clothing preferred as the performers and the audience having drunkards who come only to ogle and tease them. The Madras High Court issued a directive to disallow alcohol consumption when attending karakattam performances and to not do performances which are "obscene and vulgar".

In popular culture

In 1989, the Tamil movie Karagattakaran featured its lead actors Ramarajan, Kanaka and Kovai Sarala as performers of karakattam.  The movie went on to become very popular and an advertisement for the dance form, especially because of the music by Ilaiyaraja and the song, "Maanguyilae Poonguyile" with its karakattam choreography.

Apart from this, the devotional film Padai Veetu Amman released in 2001 had the lead actress Meena briefly performing karakattam dance in a festival song. Also, the 2002 Tamil film Sri Bannari Amman showed the central female devotee as a hereditary karakattam dancer. A song in the film featured karakattam dance.

References

External links
 Real Karagam performers
 A foreigner trying to dance Karagam
 Karagam dance in Sri Lanka by Children

Tamil dance styles
Articles containing video clips